Hebrew Seminary is a non-denominational rabbinical school in Ravenswood, Chicago, Illinois which trains both deaf and hearing students. Founded in 1992 by Rabbi Douglas Goldhamer as the first Rabbinic school for the deaf, Hebrew Seminary's stated aim is to train individuals as rabbis and Jewish educators to serve all Jewish communities, including the deaf community. The school considers itself an inclusive and egalitarian community for the study and practice of Judaism, ordaining women, men, and openly LGBT people.

Hebrew Seminary's ordination program spans 5 years. The objective of this course according to the school is to teach students to be scholars, educators, and leaders, as well as spiritual guides "who can hear and share the voice of God with members of their communities". It encourages commitment to traditional scholarship, such as Talmud and Bible, as well as the spiritual discipline of Kabbalah with meditative practices, the incorporation of which is viewed as a distinctive aspect of the rabbinic curriculum. Graduation requires all students, whether hearing or deaf, to attain fluency in American Sign Language, completion of a thesis, and an exam.

See also

Semikhah (Rabbinic Ordination)
Yeshiva

References

Jewish seminaries
Jewish universities and colleges in the United States
Jews and Judaism in Illinois
Non-denominational Judaism
Deaf universities and colleges in the United States
Deaf culture in the United States